TCNN may refer to:
Theological College of Northern Nigeria
Thai Cable News Network
Television Corporation of NewNight Malaysian TV station